"I Breathe In, I Breathe Out" is a song recorded and co-written by American country music artist Chris Cagle. It was first recorded by David Kersh on his 1998 album If I Never Stop Loving You; Kersh's version was not released as a single.

Cagle himself later recorded the song for a re-issue of his debut album Play It Loud. Released in September 2001, his version reached Number One on the U.S. Billboard country music charts in early 2002, giving Cagle the only Number One hit of his career. It also reached number 35 on the Billboard Hot 100, his only Top 40 hit to date on that chart.

Content
"I Breathe In, I Breathe Out" is a ballad that discusses the end of a relationship, and coping with it. The narrator discusses what he is doing after the breakup, and when asked by various people what he is doing without his significant other, he replies that he takes each day as it comes and subsequently hopes and waits for his ex to realize that they need each other.

Music video
The music video was directed by Eric Welch and was released in late 2001.

Peak positions
"I Breathe In, I Breathe Out" debuted at number 58 on the U.S. Billboard Hot Country Singles & Tracks for the week of September 22, 2001.

Year-end charts

References

1998 songs
2001 singles
David Kersh songs
Chris Cagle songs
Songs written by Chris Cagle
Capitol Records Nashville singles
Song recordings produced by Chris Lindsey